Napoleone Orsini (c. 1420 – September 1480) was an Italian condottiero.

The son of Orso Orsini of Bracciano, he fought for Pope Eugene IV against Francesco Sforza in 1443. Later, in the 1450s, he flanked Ferdinand of Aragon in the struggle between the Kingdom of Naples and the Duchy of Milan. Subsequently, Orsini fought against the rival baronial families of the Colonna and the Anguillara in the Lazio.

In 1461 as papal commander for Pope Pius II, he defeated Sigismondo Pandolfo Malatesta, who was moving to enter the Kingdom of Naples, at Mondolfo, in the Abruzzo. The following year he was appointed commander-in-chief of the Papal Army and warred against Roberto Malatesta, lord of Rimini, being wounded in the course of the campaign.

Orsini did not take part in any relevant military feat thenceforth.

References

External links
Page at condottieridiventura.it

1420s births
1480 deaths
15th-century condottieri
Napoleone 1